Trianthema triquetrum  (orthographic variant Trianthema triquetra) is a plant in the Aizoaceae family, found in the Sahara, the Sahel, South Africa, the Indian subcontinent, Thailand, Indonesia and all the mainland states and territories of Australia, except Victoria. 

It was first described by  Carl Ludwig Willdenow in 1803.

The species epithet, triquetrum, is a Latin adjective, which describes the plant as having three corners.

References

External links 

 Trianthema triquetra occurrence data & images from the GBIF

triquetrum
Flora of Africa
Flora of Australia
Flora of tropical Asia
Plants described in 1803
Taxa named by Carl Ludwig Willdenow